The Issaquah Sportsmen's Club is a historic building in Issaquah, Washington.

Description and history
The building's address is 23600 SE Evans Street. It was built in 1937 as part of the Works Progress Administration (WPA) with in the WPA Rustic architectural style. The building was moved from a similar wooded site to its current location in 1993. It was listed on the National Register of Historic Places on November 19, 1998.

See also
 Historic preservation
 National Register of Historic Places listings in King County, Washington
 Social club

References

External links

 

1937 establishments in Washington (state)
Buildings and structures completed in 1937
Issaquah, Washington
National Register of Historic Places in King County, Washington
Rustic architecture in Washington (state)